The Narien Range (also known as Mount Lock Range, the Mannanarie Hills or Tarcowie Hills) is a range of hills in South Australia's Mid North. The range stretches from a point north of Jamestown northwards to Orroroo.

The south-western slopes are home to the Hornsdale Wind Farm.

The name Narien is officially thought to be derived from John Narrien (1782-1860), a mathematics master who taught George Grey, Governor of South Australia in 1851 at the time of the first recorded use of the name.

References

Mountain ranges of South Australia
Geology of South Australia